Valentini Grammatikopoulou and Richèl Hogenkamp were the defending champions but chose not to participate.

Karolína Kubáňová and Aneta Kučmová won the title, defeating Nuria Brancaccio and Despina Papamichail in the final, 6–2, 7–6(11–9).

Seeds

Draw

Draw

References

External Links
Main Draw

Macha Lake Open - Doubles